The , or , is a private railway company operating three lines in Kanagawa Prefecture, Japan. It is a wholly owned subsidiary of holding company Sotetsu Holdings, Inc. Sotetsu Holdings is listed on the Tokyo Stock Exchange; 6.58% of it is owned by the Odakyu Electric Railway Company.

Overview 
Sagami Railway is one of the core companies of the Sotetsu group. Sotetsu focuses on railway operations, although formerly it had a more diversified set of holdings, such as bus lines and supermarkets. Sotetsu is the smallest company of the "Big 15" railways in Japan, as it has only short lines, but it succeeded in developing towns along its lines in the 1960s and 1970s, with many passengers ride this line. In May 1990, Sotetsu joined the major railways. In 2010 it had a daily ridership of 623,500

Lines

The company operates three passenger (commuter) lines and a freight-only line. All lines are electrified.

Passenger
 Main Line from Yokohama Station in Yokohama to Ebina Station in Ebina via Futamatagawa Station in Yokohama, 18 stations, 
 Izumino Line from Futamatagawa Station in Yokohama to Shōnandai Station in Fujisawa, 8 stations, 
 Shin-Yokohama Line from Nishiya to Hazawa yokohama-kokudai (1st stretch), 2 stations

Freight
  in Ebina

Rolling stock 
, Sotetsu operates the following electric multiple unit (EMU) train types.

 8000 series EMUs (introduced 1990)
 9000 series EMUs (introduced 1993)
 10000 series EMUs (introduced 2002)
 11000 series EMUs (introduced 2009)
 12000 series EMUs (introduced 20 April 2019)
 20000 series EMUs (introduced 11 February 2018)
 700 series 2-car EMUs modified in 2006 from 7000 series for use as an inspection and rescue train

Further 20000 series trains will be delivered ahead of the start of inter-running services to and from Tokyu Corporation lines scheduled to commence in late fiscal 2022.

Past

EMUs
 1000 series
 2000 and 2100 series EMU (introduced 1951)
 3000 series EMU (introduced 1951)
 5000 series EMU (introduced 1955)
 6000 and New 6000 series EMU (introduced 1961)
 7000 and New 7000 series EMUs (introduced 1975)

Locomotives
 Class ED10 electric locomotive

Preserved fleet 
Some withdrawn rolling stock is preserved at Kashiwadai depot.
 2000 series EMU car 2005
 6000 series EMU cars 6001 and 6021
 ED10 electric locomotive No.11
 Jinchu Railway Class 3 steam locomotive
 Jinchu Railway Class Ha20 coach

History 
The Sagami Railway was established in Chigasaki, Kanagawa, in January 1917, to transport gravel along the Sagami River valley. The first section, between Chigasaki and Samukawa was opened in 1919, and the line was extended gradually to Hashimoto in 1931. Sagami Railway started direct operation to Hachioji, but performance was sluggish during the economic depression, so Sagami Railway became a subsidiary of Tokyu in 1941.

The Jinchu Railway was established in Seya village (now, Seya-ku, Yokohama) in 1917, and opened its first section from Futamatagawa to Atsugi in May, 1926. Jinchu Railway extended to Yokohama Station in 1933, but its management had financial difficulties, so the company also became a subsidiary of Tokyu in 1939, prior to Sagami Railway. The two companies' rail lines were connected at Atsugi Station.

In April 1943, Sagami Railway took over Jinchu Railway and named two lines "Sagami Line" (original section) and "Jinchu line" (acquired section). However, in June 1944,  the Sagami Line and Nishi-Samukawa branch line were purchased by the government to use the bypass between Tokaido main line and Chuo main line. At the same time, Imperial Japanese Navy Atsugi Airport was opened, so the number of passengers and amount of freight increased sharply. As a result, Sagami Railway released all management and delegated it to Tokyu. Under Tokyu, the line gained electrification to increase the carrying capacity and in 1944, all passenger lines were electrified.

In June 1947, Sagami Railway employees bought their own shares from Tokyu and resolved the commission.

In 1952, Sagami Railway purchased the 25,000 m2 of land around Yokohama Station's west entrance from Esso, and began to develop to attract department stores.

Through service to JR and Tōkyū

This new line will enable through services between the JR East Saikyō Line and the Sōtetsu Main Line by late 2019, as well as between the Tōkyū Tōyoko Line, the Tōkyū Meguro Line & Toei Mita Subway Line and the Sōtetsu Main Line by March 2023. Sōtetsu's network will be joined to JR, Tōkyū and Toei Subway, towards the center of Tokyo Metropolis.

References

External links

 Sotetsu Group
 Sotetsu Lines history (site for kids) 

 
Railway companies of Japan
Companies based in Yokohama
Railway companies established in 1964
1964 establishments in Japan